Ty Zh Mene Pidmanula or Pidmanula, Pidvela is a popular humorous Ukrainian folk song. The name literally translates as "you tricked me and let me down".

There are many different variations of the song, but all have pretty much the same format. Traditionally, it is about a man complaining to his girlfriend because she tells him she will meet him somewhere on each day of the week. Each day, the person shows up and his girlfriend does not.

The tune is adopted from another famous Ukrainian song, "Yikhav Kozak za Dunaj".

Example of lyrics

Performances 
The song has been performed and arranged by many singers and groups in and outside of Ukraine. Some of the personalities that have recorded the song:
Duet "Dva Kolyory"
Dmytro Hnatyuk
Yaroslav Evdokimov
Sergei Lemeshev
VIA Gra
Choir of Michael Turetsky
Kalevala, folk metal group from Russia.
Trio Mandili, a folk girl group from Georgia
Ahmed Má Hlad, a Czech klezmer-punk band.

References

External links 
Ukrainian website dedicated to the song 
Description on umka.com 

Ukrainian folk songs
Comedy songs